Gyan Ganga College Of Technology (GGCT) is a technical institute located in Jabalpur, Madhya Pradesh, India. The institute offers bachelor's and master's degrees in engineering. 

Since its inception in 2006 GGCT is an ISO 9001:2010 certified technical institution affiliated to RGPV Bhopal. It runs courses like B.E in: Mechanical Engineering, Electronics & Communication Engineering, Electrical Engineering, Computer Science and Engineering, Information Technology, Civil Engineering and Electrical & Electronics Engineering. The PG courses offered by the institute are MTech in: Digital Communications and Computer Technology & Applications. 

The college has well-equipped infrastructure and a healthy environment for education and personality development.

References 

2006 establishments in Madhya Pradesh
Education in Jabalpur
Educational institutions established in 2006
Engineering colleges in Madhya Pradesh